Operation Gritrock was the code name given to the British, Irish and Canadian participation in the fight against the Ebola virus epidemic in West Africa. In November 2015, Sierra Leone was officially declared Ebola free. More than 50 members of British Army's 5 Armoured Medical Regiment were presented with operational medals for their duties in Sierra Leone during the crisis. Members of the Irish Army Medical Corps were awarded the International Operational Service Medal by the Irish government.

Deployed forces

British Army

 HQ 104 Logistic Support Brigade, Commander - Brigadier Stephen McMahon CBE (Late Royal Logistic Corps).
 5 Armoured Medical Regiment.
 22 Field Hospital, Royal Army Medical Corps (RAMC).
 34 Field Hospital, RAMC.
 30th Signal Regiment, Royal Corps of Signals.
 170 Infrastructure Support Group.

Royal Air Force
 Boeing C-17A Globemaster III.

Royal Navy
 RFA Argus (A135).
 820 Naval Air Squadron with 3 x AgustaWestland Merlin HM.2.

Irish Army
 Medical Corps
 Two teams from the Central Medical Unit (CMU)

References

Non-combat military operations involving the United Kingdom
Military operations involving the United Kingdom
21st-century Royal Air Force deployments